The Queen Charlotte Islands caribou or Dawson's caribou (Rangifer arcticus dawsoni) is an extinct subspecies of the Arctic caribou (R. arcticus) that once lived on Graham Island, the largest of the islands of Haida Gwaii in British Columbia, Canada. Possible causes of its extinction include habitat destruction, introduced disease and overhunting. It was grey in appearance. The last three caribou were killed in 1908 and can be seen at the Royal British Columbia Museum, where their pelts and bones are preserved and displayed. Recent analysis of mtDNA suggests that the Queen Charlotte Islands caribou was not genetically distinct from the subspecies from the Canadian mainland.

References

External links 
Mammal Fact Sheets:Caribou

Mammals of Canada
Reindeer
Mammal extinctions since 1500
Extinct animals of Canada
Haida Gwaii
Subspecies